Alice Tepper Marlin (born 1944) serves as President Emerita, Founder, and a member of the board of Social Accountability International (SAI), a standard-setting organization for improving workplaces and communities. SAI is headquartered in New York City. She served as President and CEO from 1997 to 2015. 

SAI provides substantial capacity building services for its members and the SA8000® Standard, which was designed by a multi-stakeholder Advisory Board to assure decent workplaces and excellent human resource management worldwide. SA8000 is based on United Nations and ILO Conventions and Declarations, and on the ISO management systems. SAI licenses qualified organizations to verify compliance with the highly respected SA8000 Standard. It carries out public/private partnerships in various countries, supported by the US Dept. of Labor, the European Community and others. Its Ten Squared and Social Fingerprint tools are invaluable tools for responsible supply chain management and for improving work conditions and business KPIs at factories and farms worldwide.

Alice Tepper Marlin earned her bachelor's degree in Economics in 1966 from Wellesley College, and studied at the NYU Graduate School of Business Administration where she developed and taught its first Business & Society MBA course. 

Early in her career she served as a Securities Analyst and Labor Economist at Burnham and Company and as the editor of an international tax journal at the International Bureau of Fiscal Documentation in the Netherlands. She designed and managed the first social investment portfolio management service, in 1968.

In 1969, she founded the Council on Economic Priorities (CEP), where she served as President and CEO for 33 years. CEP pioneered the social investment field and regularly published the best-selling consumer guide, “Shopping for a Better World”(Ballantine Books).

Tepper Marlin has been a frequent public speaker on corporate accountability for five decades. She is also Citi Distinguished Fellow in Ethics and Leadership at NYU’s Stern School of Business where she also serves as an Adjunct Professor in the Business and Society Program . Additionally, Alice served as a Faculty Member at Wellesley College’s Madeleine Albright Institute for Global Affairs.  Tepper Marlin is a Member of the Council on Foreign Relations, an Ashoka Global Fellow and a Right Livelihood Laureate which was awarded for "showing the direction in which the Western economy must develop to promote the well-being of humanity."

Publications

Honors and awards
 2010 Top 100 Thought Leaders in Trustworthy Business Behavior,
 Founding Member, The Global Academy for Social Entrepreneurship, Ashoka, 2005
 Board Member, ISEAL Alliance, 2000 to 2011
 Right Livelihood Honorary Award, 1990.
 Woman of Year Award, Adweek, 1990.
 Honorary Doctor of Laws Degree, Pine Manor College, 1990
 Woodrow Wilson Senior Fellow, 1974–77

Feature articles
Profiled in: People, New York Times, Vogue, Time, Miami Herald, Newsday, Los Angeles Times, Palm Beach Post, The Philadelphia Inquirer, Asahi Simbun and numerous European publications.

Media
Alice Tepper Marlin has been featured on NBC-TV’s The Today Show, ABC-TV’s Good Morning America, CBS-TV’s Morning News, CNN and many other television shows, plus over 1,000 radio programs.

References 

American nonprofit executives
Wellesley College alumni
New York University Stern School of Business alumni
Living people
1944 births
Women nonprofit executives